Nicholas Mark Catania (born 18 December 1945) is a former Australian politician. Catania served as Mayor of the City of Vincent in inner-city Perth, Western Australia, between 2001 and 2011. He was a member of the Western Australian Legislative Assembly for the Electoral district of Balcatta between 1989 and 1996.

Catania was born in Castell'Umberto, Italy and is the father of National Party politician Vince Catania.

References

1945 births
Living people
Members of the Western Australian Legislative Assembly
Mayors of places in Western Australia
Australian politicians of Italian descent
Australian people of Sicilian descent
Australian Labor Party members of the Parliament of Western Australia
Italian emigrants to Australia